Coussarea is a genus of flowering plants in the family Rubiaceae. The genus is found from southern Mexico to tropical America.

There are about 120 species. They are shrubs and trees with oppositely arranged leaves and large, showy white flowers with four lobes. The flowers are often fragrant.

Species

Coussarea accedens Müll.Arg.
Coussarea acuminata (Ruiz & Pav.) Zappi
Coussarea albescens (DC.) Müll.Arg.
Coussarea amapaensis Steyerm.
Coussarea ampla Müll.Arg.
Coussarea amplifolia C.M.Taylor
Coussarea andrei M.S.Pereira & M.R.V.Barbosa
Coussarea antioquiana C.M.Taylor
Coussarea auriculata Standl.
Coussarea bahiensis Müll.Arg.
Coussarea bernardii Steyerm.
Coussarea biflora (Vell.) Müll.Arg.
Coussarea bocainae M.Gomes
Coussarea brevicaulis K.Krause
Coussarea brevipedunculata C.M.Taylor
Coussarea capitata (Benth.) Müll.Arg.
Coussarea caroliana Standl.
Coussarea catingana Müll.Arg.
Coussarea cephaeloides C.M.Taylor
Coussarea cerroazulensis Dwyer & M.V.Hayden
Coussarea chiapensis Borhidi
Coussarea coffeoides Müll.Arg.
Coussarea congestiflora Müll.Arg.
Coussarea contracta (Walp.) Benth. & Hook.f. ex Müll.Arg.
Coussarea cuatrecasasii Standl. ex Steyerm.
Coussarea curvigemma Dwyer
Coussarea duckei Standl.
Coussarea dulcifolia D.Neill
Coussarea duplex C.M.Taylor
Coussarea durifolia Dwyer
Coussarea ecuadorensis C.M.Taylor
Coussarea enneantha Standl.
Coussarea evoluta Steyerm.
Coussarea fanshawei Steyerm.
Coussarea flava Poepp.
Coussarea friburgensis M.Gomes
Coussarea frondosa S.Moore
Coussarea garciae Standl.
Coussarea graciliflora (Mart.) Müll.Arg.
Coussarea grandifolia Rusby
Coussarea grandis Müll.Arg.
Coussarea granvillei Delprete & B.M.Boom
Coussarea hallei Steyerm.
Coussarea hirticalyx Standl.
Coussarea hyacinthiflora Standl.
Coussarea hydrangeifolia (Benth.) Benth. & Hook.f. ex Müll.Arg.
Coussarea ilheotica Müll.Arg.
Coussarea imitans L.O.Williams
Coussarea impetiolaris Donn.Sm.
Coussarea insignis Ducke
Coussarea janeirensis Standl.
Coussarea japurana Standl.
Coussarea klugii Steyerm.
Coussarea krukovii Standl.
Coussarea lagoensis Müll.Arg.
Coussarea lanceolata (Vell.) Müll.Arg.
Coussarea lasseri Steyerm.
Coussarea latifolia Standl.
Coussarea leptoloba (Spreng. ex Benth. & Hook.f.) Müll.Arg.
Coussarea leptophagma Müll.Arg.
Coussarea leptopus Müll.Arg.
Coussarea liesneri Steyerm.
Coussarea liliiflora Standl.
Coussarea linearis C.M.Taylor
Coussarea locuples Standl.
Coussarea loftonii (Dwyer & M.V.Hayden) Dwyer
Coussarea longiacuminata Standl.
Coussarea longiflora (Mart.) Müll.Arg.
Coussarea longifolia Müll.Arg.
Coussarea longilaciniata Delprete
Coussarea machadoana Standl.
Coussarea macrocalyx Standl.
Coussarea macrophylla (Mart.) Müll.Arg.
Coussarea mapourioides Bremek.
Coussarea megalocarpa Standl.
Coussarea megistophylla Standl.
Coussarea meridionalis (Vell.) Müll.Arg.
Coussarea mexicana Standl.
Coussarea micrococca Bremek.
Coussarea moritziana (Benth.) Standl.
Coussarea nodosa (Benth.) Müll.Arg.
Coussarea obliqua Standl.
Coussarea obscura Müll.Arg.
Coussarea ovalis Standl.
Coussarea paniculata (Vahl) Standl.
Coussarea penetantha Standl.
Coussarea petiolaris (Benth.) Standl.
Coussarea pilosiflora Standl.
Coussarea pilosula C.M.Taylor
Coussarea pittieri Steyerm.
Coussarea platyphylla Müll.Arg.
Coussarea procumbens (Vell.) Müll.Arg.
Coussarea rafa-torresii Borhidi
Coussarea regnelliana Müll.Arg.
Coussarea resinosa C.M.Taylor
Coussarea revoluta Steyerm.
Coussarea rudgeoides Rusby
Coussarea sancti-ciprianii C.M.Taylor
Coussarea schiffneri Zahlbr.
Coussarea sessilifolia Standl.
Coussarea speciosa K.Schum. ex Glaziou
Coussarea spicata Delprete
Coussarea spiciformis C.M.Taylor
Coussarea strigosipes Müll.Arg.
Coussarea surinamensis Bremek.
Coussarea talamancana Standl.
Coussarea tenuiflora Standl.
Coussarea terepaimensis Steyerm.
Coussarea tortilis Standl.
Coussarea tricephala Standl.
Coussarea triflora Müll.Arg.
Coussarea uniflora Gardner
Coussarea urbaniana Standl.
Coussarea urophylla Standl.
Coussarea vallis Standl. ex Steyerm.
Coussarea venosa Standl.
Coussarea veraguensis Dwyer
Coussarea verticillata Müll.Arg.
Coussarea violacea Aubl.
Coussarea viridis Müll.Arg.

References 

Rubiaceae genera
Coussareeae
Flora of South America